Torre Egger is one of the mountains of the Southern Patagonian Ice Field in South America. It is located in a region which is disputed between Argentina and Chile, west of Cerro Chalten (also known as Fitz Roy). The peak is between Cerro Torre, the highest in a four mountain chain and Cerro Stanhardt. It is named after the Austrian alpinist Toni Egger (1926–1959), who died while attempting neighboring Cerro Torre.

First ascent
In 1976, John Bragg, Jim Donini and Jay Wilson from the United States climbed Torre Egger by climbing first to the col between the peak and Cerro Torre, the Col of Conquest, and then up the ridge to the peak.  The ascent was hampered by bad weather and took from December 1975 to February 22, 1976, when the 3-person team summited.

Other ascents

 1986 Psycho Vertical (Southeast Face) (UIAA ED+ VII+ A3 90deg, 950m) Janez Jeglič, Silvo Karo, Franc Knez (Slovenia), December 7, 1986.
 1987 Titanic (East Pillar) (UIAA VI+ A2 7b M5 WI4, 950m), Maurizio Giarolli and Elio Orlandi (Italy), November 2 to 5, 1987.
 1994 Badlands (YDS VI 5.10 A3 WI4+, 1000m) Conrad Anker, Jay Smith and Steve Gerberding (US), FA 12 December 1994.
 2005 Titanic (East Pillar) (UIAA VI+ A2 7b M5 WI4, 950m) Steph Davis, Dean Potter. The first female ascent of Torre Egger and likely the first one-day ascent of the mountain.
 2012 Die another day (west face) (UIAA VIII A1) Matteo Bernasconi, Matteo Della Bordella. The route ends 25m below Col de Lux.
 2013 Notti Magiche (West face) (UIAA VIII A1) Matteo Della Bordella, Luca Schiera. From Col de Lux to the top, followed the Huber-Sharf, 200m of rock and ice.
 2016 Titanic (East Pillar) (UIAA VI+ A2 7b M5 WI4, 950m) Marc-André Leclerc. First winter solo.

In January 2008, Rolando Garibotti and Colin Haley made the first complete traverse of the entire massif, climbing Aguja Standhardt, Punta Herron, Torre Egger and Cerro Torre together. They rate their route at YDS VI 5.11 A1 WI6 Mushroom Ice 6, with  total vertical gain. This had been "one of the world's most iconic, unclimbed lines", first attempted by Ermanno Salvaterra.

References

External links
 Map of Cerro Torre area
 Cerro Torre on SummitPost.org

Mountains of Argentina
Landforms of Santa Cruz Province, Argentina
Torre
Última Esperanza Province
Landforms of Magallanes Region